Nama is a rural locality (an ulus) in Kurumkansky District, Republic of Buryatia, Russia. The population was 93 as of 2010.

Geography 
Nama is located 84 km northeast of Kurumkan (the district's administrative centre) by road. Yagdyg is the nearest rural locality.

References 

Rural localities in Kurumkansky District